Harry Scott Bennett (1 June 1877 – 24 May 1959), originally Henry Gilbert Scott Bennett, was an Australian socialist speaker and organiser. He was born in Chilwell, Victoria and died in Sydney.

He was MLA for Ballarat West, Victoria for the Labor Party 1904–1907.

He spent 1913–1915 in New Zealand (where John A. Lee heard him while they were in prison) and 1915–1917 in the United States.

Notes 
Page at Australian Dictionary of Biography
Page on Victorian Parliament website

1877 births
1959 deaths
Victoria (Australia) state politicians
New Zealand socialists
Australian emigrants to New Zealand
Members of the Victorian Legislative Assembly
Australian Labor Party members of the Parliament of Victoria
Social Democratic Party (New Zealand) politicians